In enzymology, a xylitol oxidase is an enzyme that catalyzes the chemical reaction

xylitol + O2  xylose + H2O2

Thus, the two substrates of this enzyme are xylitol and O2, whereas its two products are xylose and H2O2.

This enzyme belongs to the family of oxidoreductases, specifically those acting on the CH-OH group of donor with oxygen as acceptor.  The systematic name of this enzyme class is xylitol:oxygen oxidoreductase.

References 

 

EC 1.1.3
Enzymes of unknown structure